The American Mathematical Monthly is a mathematical journal founded by Benjamin Finkel in 1894. It is published ten times each year by Taylor & Francis for the Mathematical Association of America.

The American Mathematical Monthly is an expository journal intended for a wide audience of mathematicians, from undergraduate students to research professionals. Articles are chosen on the basis of their broad interest and reviewed and edited for quality of exposition as well as content. In this the American Mathematical Monthly fulfills a different role from that of typical mathematical research journals. The American Mathematical Monthly is the most widely read mathematics journal in the world according to records on JSTOR.

Tables of contents with article abstracts from 1997–2010 are available online.

The MAA gives the Lester R. Ford Awards annually to "authors of articles of expository excellence" published in the American Mathematical Monthly.

Editors
2022–    : Della Dumbaugh
2017–2021: Susan Colley
2012–2016: Scott T. Chapman
2007–2011: Daniel J. Velleman
2002–2006: Bruce Palka
1997–2001: Roger A. Horn
1992–1996: John H. Ewing
1987–1991: Herbert S. Wilf
1982–1986: Paul Richard Halmos
1978–1981: Ralph Philip Boas, Jr.
1977–1978: Alex Rosenberg and Ralph Philip Boas Jr.
1974–1976: Alex Rosenberg
1969–1973: Harley Flanders
1967–1968: Robert Abraham Rosenbaum
1962–1966: Frederick Arthur Ficken
1957–1961: Ralph Duncan James
1952–1956: Carl Barnett Allendoerfer
1947–1951: Carroll Vincent Newsom
1942–1946: Lester Randolph Ford
1937–1941: Elton James Moulton
1932–1936: Walter Buckingham Carver
1927–1931: William Henry Bussey
1923–1926: Walter Burton Ford
1922: Albert Arnold Bennett
1919–1921: Raymond Clare Archibald
1918: Robert Daniel Carmichael
1916–1917: Herbert Ellsworth Slaught
1914–1915: Board of editors: C.H. Ashton, R.P. Baker, W.C. Brenke, W.H. Bussey, W.DeW. Cairns, Florian Cajori, R.D. Carmichael, D.R. Curtiss, I.M. DeLong, B.F. Finkel, E.R. Hedrick, L.C. Karpinski, G.A. Miller, W.H. Roever, H.E. Slaught
1913: Herbert Ellsworth Slaught
1909–1912: Benjamin Franklin Finkel, Herbert Ellsworth Slaught, George Abram Miller
1907–1908: Benjamin Franklin Finkel, Herbert Ellsworth Slaught
1905–1906: Benjamin Franklin Finkel, Leonard Eugene Dickson, Oliver Edmunds Glenn
1904: Benjamin Franklin Finkel, Leonard Eugene Dickson, Saul Epsteen
1903: Benjamin Franklin Finkel, Leonard Eugene Dickson
1894–1902: Benjamin Franklin Finkel, John Marvin Colaw

See also
Mathematics Magazine
Notices of the American Mathematical Society, another "most widely read mathematics journal in the world"

Notes

External links
 American Mathematical Monthly homepage
 Archive of tables of contents with article summaries
 Mathematical Association of America
 American Mathematical Monthly on JSTOR
 The American mathematical monthly, hathitrust

Mathematics journals
Publications established in 1894
Academic journals published by learned and professional societies of the United States
10 times per year journals
English-language journals
Mathematical Association of America